The Tatra T18 was a Czechoslovakian draisine designed and manufactured by Tatra in the 1920s.

References
 Adam Jońca. Tatra T18. Opancerzona drezyna. „Technika Wojskowa Historia”. 5/2013, p. 94–97, 2013. Warszawa: Magnum-X Sp. z o.o.. ISSN 2080-9743

Tatra vehicles
Military draisines
Military vehicles introduced in the 1920s
Armoured fighting vehicles of World War II